Mark Williams (born 11 August 1966) is a South African former international footballer who played as a forward for many clubs throughout his career, including Corinthians (Brazil), Wolverhampton Wanderers (England), Chongqing Lifan (China), Qingdao Zhongneng (China) and RWDM (Belgium). At Wolves he scored once; his goal coming in a League Cup tie against Fulham in October 1995. Internationally he is predominantly remembered for being in the squad that played in the 1996 African Cup of Nations where he was the joint second scorer with 4 goals, and scored both goals in the final after coming on as a substitute, in which South Africa beat Tunisia 2–0 to win the cup for the first time. When he retired he would have played for the South Africa national football team 23 times, scoring 8 goals. As of December 2006 he is playing for South African Beach Soccer team.

Career statistics

International

Honours

Club
Qiánwéi Huándǎo
Chinese FA Cup: 2000

Shanghai Zhongyuan Huili
Chinese Jia B League: 2001　

Qingdao Hademen
Chinese FA Cup: 2002

International
South Africa national football team
African Cup of Nations: 1996

References

External links
 

1966 births
Living people
South African soccer players
South African expatriate soccer players
South Africa international soccer players
1996 African Cup of Nations players
1997 FIFA Confederations Cup players
Expatriate footballers in Brazil
Expatriate footballers in China
Jomo Cosmos F.C. players
Mamelodi Sundowns F.C. players
Hellenic F.C. players
Cape Town Spurs F.C. players
R.W.D. Molenbeek players
Wolverhampton Wanderers F.C. players
Kaizer Chiefs F.C. players
Chongqing Liangjiang Athletic F.C. players
Beijing Renhe F.C. players
Qingdao Hainiu F.C. (1990) players
Moroka Swallows F.C. players
Sport Club Corinthians Paulista players
Cape Coloureds
Sportspeople from Cape Town
Expatriate footballers in Brunei
South African expatriate sportspeople in Belgium
South African expatriate sportspeople in Brazil
South African expatriate sportspeople in China
Brunei (Malaysia Premier League team) players
Association football forwards